Equally Cursed and Blessed is the third studio album by Welsh band Catatonia, released in April 1999 via Blanco y Negro Records. It reached number one in the UK Album Chart, and three singles were released from it: "Dead from the Waist Down", "Londinium" and "Karaoke Queen".

Recording
While touring in the United States following the success of their second studio album, International Velvet, Catatonia recorded sample demos onto a DPS12 hard disk recorder in their tour bus upon the recommendation of their producer, TommyD. They returned to the Monnow Valley Studio in Monmouth, Wales, where they had recorded the previous album, to record Equally Cursed and Blessed.

Release and promotion
The album was announced in January 1999; the title taken from a line in the song "She's a Millionaire". The first single, "Dead from the Waist Down" was released on 29 March 1999, with the album released on 12 April. This repeated the release schedule used for International Velvet, which had been preceded by "Mulder and Scully" by the same period of time.

Equally Cursed and Blessed faced competition from ABBA's 1992 compilation album Gold: Greatest Hits for the number one spot on the UK Album Chart, as the ABBA album had re-charted due to the success of the Mamma Mia! musical featuring the band's songs. But by midweek, the Catatonia album was 15,000 sales ahead and it went on to secure the top place in the chart. At the time, all three Catatonia studio albums were in the top 40. Equally Cursed and Blessed went on to be certificated platinum by the British Phonographic Industry showing at least 300,000 copies sold.
The American release of the album saw two tracks from International Velvet added, including "Road Rage".

Singles
The album spawned one top-10 single, "Dead from the Waist Down", which reached number seven. The band had intended to release "Karaoke Queen" as the follow up, but were overruled by the record label and they were forced to release "Londinium" on 12 July 1999 instead. This angered lead singer Cerys Matthews, as did the expense of the video for the single which had cost more than Equally Cursed and Blessed took to make. "Londinium" failed to reach the top ten, placing at number 20. "Karaoke Queen" was released as the third single on 1 November 1999 but stalled at number 36. "Nothing Hurts" was slated to be the fourth single release from the album but was shelved following the low chart placement of "Karaoke Queen".

Track listing

Personnel
 Cerys Matthews – vocals
 Mark Roberts – guitar
 Owen Powell – guitar
 Paul Jones – bass
 Aled Richards – drums

Charts

Weekly charts

Year-end charts

Certifications

Notes

References

 

Catatonia (band) albums
1999 albums
Blanco y Negro Records albums